The MTV Movie Awards Mexico was an awards show which were established in 2003. The show is based on the US MTV Movie Awards format celebrating local film and actors.

Winners

2001

Favorite Movie - México:
Amores perros
La ley de Herodes
Por la libre
Favorite Movie - Chile:
Angel Negro
Coronación
El Chacotero Sentimental: La película
Favorite Movie - Argentina:
76-89-03
Nueve reinas
Plata Quemada

2002

Favorite Movie - México: Y Tu Mamá También
Favorite Movie - Chile: Taxi para tres
Favorite Movie - Argentina: Déjala correr
Best Song from a Movie: "De La Calle" — Ely Guerra (De la calle)
Best Mexican Talent Drain Abroad: Guillermo del Toro - El Espinazo Del Diablo (director)
Best Kiss: Diego Luna and Maribel Verdú - Y Tu Mamá También 
Best Insult: Diego Luna and Gael García Bernal - Y Tu Mamá También
Sexiest Woman: Bárbara Mori - Inspiración 
Baddest Mon: María Rojo - Nadie te oye: Perfume de violetas

2003

Favorite Movie: Amar te duele
Favorite Actress: Martha Higareda as Renata - Amar te duele
Favorite Actor: Gael García Bernal as El Padre Amaro - El crimen del Padre Amaro 
Best Song from a Movie: "Amarte Duele" — Natalia Lafourcade (Amar te duele)
Hottest Scene: Miguel Rodarte with everyone - El Tigre De Santa Julia
Favorite Villain: Alfonso Herrera as Francisco - Amar te duele
Best Bichir in a Movie: Demián Bichir as Manny - Bendito infierno

2004

Favorite Movie: Nicotina
Favorite Actress: Ana de la Reguera as Ana - Ladies' Night
Favorite Actor: Diego Luna as Lolo - Nicotina
Best Song from a Movie: "Desde Que Llegaste" — Reyli (Ladies' Night)
Hottest Scene: Table Dance of Ana Claudia Talancón and Ana de la Reguera - Ladies' Night
Best Diego Luna in a Movie: As Lolo - Nicotina 
Worst Smoker: Lolo (Diego Luna) - Nicotina
Best Cameo: José María Yazpik as Joaquín the Neighbor - Nicotina
Sexiest Hero: Orlando Bloom as Will Turner - Pirates of the Caribbean: The Curse of the Black Pearl
Sexiest Villain: Demi Moore as Madison Lee - Charlie's Angels: Full Throttle  
Best Cinematography in a Video Scandal: René Bejarano or "Don't Close Me the Briefcase"
Best Colin Farrell in a Movie: as Jim - S.W.A.T. 
Best Miracle in a Movie: The bust of Grace (Bruce makes the breasts bigger of his wife) - Bruce Almighty (Jim Carrey) 
Best Look: Johnny Depp as Jack Sparrow - Pirates of the Caribbean: The Curse of the Black Pearl
Most Funniest "Gringo" in Japan: Tom Cruise as Nathan Algren - The Last Samurai 
Legend Award: Rosa Gloria Chagoyán

2005

Favorite Movie: Matando Cabos
Favorite Actor: Tony Dalton as Jaque - Matando Cabos
Favorite Actress: Danny Perea as Rita - Temporada de patos
Best Song from a Movie: "Un Héroe Real" — Aleks Syntek (Robots)
Favorite Voice from an Animated Movie: Eugenio Derbez as Donkey - Shrek 2
Most Bizariest Sex: Jacqueline Voltaire and Silverio Palacios - Matando Cabos
Best Trio for a Movie: Anahí, Dulce María and Jolette - Rebeldía Académica
Legend Award: Xavier López

See also
Cinema of Mexico

External links
MTV Latin America official site

Mexican television specials
MTV Movie & TV Awards